Serrenti is a comune (municipality) in the Province of South Sardinia in the Italian region Sardinia, located about  northwest of Cagliari and about  southeast of Sanluri.

Serrenti borders the following municipalities: Furtei, Guasila, Nuraminis, Samassi, Samatzai, Sanluri, Serramanna.

Demographic evolution

References

External links

 www.comune.serrenti.ca.it/

Cities and towns in Sardinia